Lingankoppa is a village in Dharwad district of Karnataka, India.

Demographics 
As of the 2011 Census of India there were 187 households in Lingankoppa and a total population of 1,009 consisting of 516 males and 493 females. There were 168 children ages 0-6.

References

Villages in Dharwad district